The Duke of Devonshire Emerald is one of the world's largest and most famous uncut emeralds, weighing . Originating in the mine at Muzo, Colombia, it was either gifted or sold by Emperor Pedro I of Brazil to William Cavendish, 6th Duke of Devonshire in 1831. It was displayed at the Great Exhibition in London in 1851, and more recently at the Natural History Museum in 2007.

See also 

 Colombian emeralds
 Muzo
 List of individual gemstones
 List of emeralds by size

References 

Individual emeralds
Colombian emeralds